The St. Michael's Buzzers are a Junior "A" ice hockey team from Toronto, Ontario, Canada.  They compete in the Ontario Junior Hockey League (OJHL).

History
The St. Michael's Buzzers date back to at least 1920, as future NHLer Bobby Bauer had made his home at St. Mikes for the 1930-31 season. The team was founded around 1932-33.

The Buzzers won the first ever Sutherland Cup as All-Ontario Junior "B" Champions in 1934, and won it again in 1936, 1945, 1961, 1982, and 1989. They also won the Frank L. Buckland Trophy as OPJHL Champions in 2005, 2006 and 2013.

The 1933-34 season saw them finish second in the Ontario Hockey Association Junior Hockey League behind their own parent club, the Toronto St. Michael's Majors.  As "A" champions, the Majors went on to win the Memorial Cup, while the Buzzers went on to win the Sutherland Cup as Ontario "B" champions. The next season, the Big 10 Junior B league was formed and the Buzzers left to join it.

In the 1950s, the Buzzers established themselves in the Metro Junior B Hockey League. In 1961, the Buzzers defeated the Big 10's Owen Sound Greys 4-games-to-none to win the Sutherland Cup.  They played from 1961 to 1963 as an independent Jr.B club, as their parent club, the Toronto St. Michael's Majors, struggled financially. In 1966-67 the team again took a one-year leave of absence.  Despite this, the Buzzers played during the glory years of the Metro league. In 1972, the Ontario Provincial Junior A Hockey League was formed and raided the league for all but four of its charter members, of which one of these teams folded. A season later, the OPJHL also took the Markham Waxers leaving the Metro league with only the Buzzers and Toronto Nationals as the league's original blood. By 1980, the Nationals had folded and had left the Buzzers as the only team left in a twelve team league that pre-dated the 1972 realignment.

The team again took a leave of absence in 1989 after their Sutherland Cup championship, after the Metro League's dispute with the OHA. The following season the Vaughan Raiders merged with the Buzzers, assuming the Buzzer name. The Buzzers left the Metro league in 1995 to join the new Ontario Provincial Junior A Hockey League.

The Buzzers disbanded in 1997 to make way for the Ontario Hockey League's St. Michael's Majors. They reformed in 1999, and won the OJHL Championship in 2005, 2006 and 2013.

Season-by-season results

Playoffs
MetJHL Years
1991 Lost Quarter-final
Henry Carr Crusaders defeated St. Michael's Buzzers 4-games-to-none
1992 Lost Quarter-final
St. Michael's Buzzers defeated Weston Dodgers 3-games-to-none
Muskoka Bears defeated St. Michael's Buzzers 4-games-to-3
1993 Lost Final
St. Michael's Buzzers defeated Mississauga Senators 4-games-to-2
St. Michael's Buzzers defeated Muskoka Bears 4-games-to-none
Wexford Raiders defeated St. Michael's Buzzers 4-games-to-1
1994 Lost Quarter-final
Muskoka Bears defeated St. Michael's Buzzers 4-games-to-2
1995 Lost Semi-final
St. Michael's Buzzers defeated Aurora Eagles 4-games-to-2
Caledon Canadians defeated St. Michael's Buzzers 4-games-to-none
OJHL Years

Sutherland Cup appearances
1961: St. Michael's Buzzers defeated Owen Sound Greys 4-games-to-none
1982: St. Michael's Buzzers defeated Sarnia Bees 4-games-to-3
1989: St. Michael's Buzzers defeated Niagara Falls Canucks 4-games-to-1

Vaughan Raiders

Notable alumni
Bob Babcock 
Bobby Bauer
Frank Bennett
Mike Boland
Kip Brennan
Greg Britz
Brad Brown
Brandon Burlon
Sean Burke
Charlie Burns
Jack Caffery
Billy Carroll
Louie Caporusso
Gino Cavallini
Andre Champagne
Gerry Cheevers
Andrew Cogliano
Mike Corbett
Mike Corrigan
Rob Cowie
Jack Crawford
Doug Dadswell
Rob Davison
Joe Day
Gord Dineen
Kevin Dineen
Bruce Draper
Dick Duff
Craig Duncanson
Todd Elik
John English
Jake Evans
Larry Fullan
Dave Gardner
Paul Gardner
Paul Gillis
Mike Glumac
Chris Govedaris
Pat Graham
Ray Hannigan
Jeff Harding
David Harlock
Brayden Irwin
John Jakopin
Larry Keenan
Red Kelly
Dave Keon
Ken Klee
Brett Lindros
Eric Lindros
David Ling
Billy MacMillan
Pete Mahovlich
Dave Maloney
Jean Marois
Bill McDonagh
John McLellan
Scott McLellan
Nick Metz
Norm Milley
Craig Mills
Garry Monahan
Steve Montador
Craig Muni
Jason Muzzatti
Peanuts O'Flaherty
Tom O'Neill
Jim Paek
Geoff Platt
Tom Polanic
Marc Reaume
Mike Rosati
Ed Sandford
Howard Scruton
Rod Seiling
Richard Shulmistra
Carl Smith
Brendan Smith
Reilly Smith
Rory Smith (Lacrosse player)
Anthony Stewart
Mike Stothers
Peter Sullivan
Andy Sutton
Tony Tanti
Billy Taylor
Rick Tocchet
Kevin Weekes
Wojtek Wolski
Jason Woolley
Mitch Marner
Dwight Schofield
Raiders
Manny Legace

References

External links
Buzzers Webpage

Ontario Provincial Junior A Hockey League teams
Ice hockey teams in Toronto